Adam Cozad is an American screenwriter best known for writing the scripts for Jack Ryan: Shadow Recruit, The Legend of Tarzan, and Underwater.

Life and career 
Cozad was born and grew up in Chico, California, where he attended Notre Dame School until his tenth grade. He later moved to Texas and went to Trinity University, where he got his major degree in history.

In 2014, Cozad wrote his first screenplay for the action film Jack Ryan: Shadow Recruit, based on the character created by Tom Clancy, with rewrites by David Koepp, of Jurassic Park and Spider-Man fame. Shadow Recruit stars Kevin Costner, Chris Pine, Keira Knightley and Kenneth Branagh (who also directed).

His second screenplay was for the action adventure film The Legend of Tarzan, which he wrote along with Craig Brewer from their own story, which stars Alexander Skarsgård, Margot Robbie, and Christoph Waltz.

Cozad had been hired to write the screenplay for the sequel to Suicide Squad film. He was replaced with James Gunn.

He also performed a revision of Underwater's script from Brian Duffield.

Filmography

References

External links 
 

Living people
American male screenwriters
Trinity University (Texas) alumni
People from Chico, California
Year of birth missing (living people)
Screenwriters from California
21st-century American screenwriters
21st-century American male writers